Released by IF? Records in Melbourne, Australia, between the years 1995-1997, the Zeitgeist series ran to three volumes, including a double-CD release that was volume 2.

The series featured a line-up of mostly Melbourne-based, and chiefly new, experimental electronic and techno producers - including Voiteck, Zen Paradox, Little Nobody, Artificial, Josh Abrahams, and David Thrussell, along with Honeysmack, Blimp, Son Of Zev, Soulenoid, Guyver 3, TR-Storm, Q-Kontrol, FSOM, and Mute Freak.

"It's harsh, hard, at times unlistenable," appraised Mixmag editor Dom Phillips, of the first Zeitgeist compilation in 1995. "It's industrial techno that's quite insane, yet oddly inspiring."

Phillips nominated the compilation at #4 in his choice of the Top 10 Melbourne-made records up to 1996.

Aside from being produced and distributed throughout Australia by IF? Records, the first two Zeitgeist compilations were also repackaged and distributed internationally through Belgian label Nova Zembla, a subsidiary of Kk.

"Melbourne's IF? label delivers another knockout collection of predominantly Victorian, predominantly four-on-the-floor beats. Stunning packaging and nicely intro-ed and outro-ed, the compilation as a whole is well worth the investment." Seb Chan in Sydney's 3D World newspaper in 1997, writing about the compilation Zeitgeist 3.

References

Compilation albums by Australian artists
Experimental music albums
Compilation album series
1990s compilation albums